Damsa is a 2019 Pakistani crime drama television series, produced by Asmaira Dossani, Kashif Dossani, Shazia Wajahat and Wajahat Rauf under their banner Showcase Productions and directed by Najaf Bilgrami. It stars Nadia Jamil, Emaan Khan, Shahood Alvi and Momal Sheikh in leading roles. The serial explores the topic of child trafficking.

Cast
Emaan Sheikh as Damsa
Nadia Jamil as Areeja (Damsa's mother)
Shahood Alvi as Musa (Damsa's father)
Falak Naeem as Rahim (Damsa's brother)
Gul-e-Rana as Rehana (Musa's mother)
Ayesha Gul as Sofia (Musa's sister)
Ismat Zaidi as Abru (Areeja's mother)
Talat Hussain as Sohail (Restaurant owner)
Momal Sheikh as Saman (Sohail's daughter)
Saad Zameer Fareedi as Mazaari

References

2019 Pakistani television series debuts